The 2021–22 Qatari League, also known as Qatar Stars League or QNB Stars League, was the 48th edition of top-level football championship in Qatar. The league kicked off on 11 September 2021 and ended on 11 March 2022. Al-Sadd were defending champions and won the league for a second straight undefeated season.

Teams

Team location

Stadia and locations

Personnel and kits

Managerial changes

Foreign players
 Players name in bold indicates the player is registered during the mid-season transfer window.
 Players in italics were out of squad or left club within the season, after pre-season transfer window, or in the mid-season transfer window, and at least had one appearance.

League table

Results

Positions by round

Relegation play-off

Season statistics

Top scorers

Top assists

References

External links
 

Qatar Stars League seasons
1
Qatar